Anselmo Sperelli was a Roman Catholic prelate who served as Bishop of San Leone (1526–1531).

Biography
Anselmo Sperelli was ordained a priest in the Order of Friars Minor. On 19 Jan 1526, he was appointed during the papacy of Pope Clement VII as Bishop of San Leone. He served as Bishop of San Leone until his resignation in 1531.

References 

16th-century Italian Roman Catholic bishops
Bishops appointed by Pope Clement VII
Franciscan bishops